Zbigniew is a Polish masculine given name, originally Zbygniew . This West Slavic name is derived from the Polish elements Zby- (from zbyć, zbyć się, or pozbyć się, meaning "to dispel", "to get rid of") and gniew, meaning "anger". Its diminutive forms include Zbyszek and Zbyś. The Czech form of this name is Zbyněk (derived from Zbyhněv).

Individuals with this name may celebrate their name day on February 17, March 17, April 1, June 16 or October 10.

English diminutive of this name is Zibi, Zbiggy or Zbig.

Notable people 
 Zbigniew of Brzezia (c. 1360 – c. 1425), Polish knight and nobleman of Clan Zadora
 Zbigniew of Poland, high duke of Poland from 1102–1106

A
 Zbigniew Andruszkiewicz (born 1959), Polish rower

B
 Zbigniew Babiński (1896–1940), Polish military and sports aviator
 Zbigniew Bargielski (born 1937), Polish composer
 Zbigniew Baranowski (born 1991), Polish wrestler
 Zbigniew Bartman (born 1987), Polish volleyball player
 Zbigniew Beta (born 1953), Polish long jumper
 Zbigniew Bieńkowski (1913–1994), Polish poet, literary critic, translator and essayist
 Zbigniew Boniek (born 1956), Polish footballer, manager, and President of the Polish Football Association
 Zbigniew Brym (1919–2006), Polish military, photographer and publicist
 Zbigniew Bródka (born 1984), Polish speed skater, 2014 Olympic champion in 1500 metres
 Zbigniew Brzeziński (1928–2017), Polish-American diplomat and political scientist
 Zbigniew Buczkowski (born 1951), Polish film actor and entertainer
 Zbigniew Bujak (born 1954), opposition activist in the People's Republic of Poland
 Zbigniew Bujarski (1933–2018), Polish composer
 Zbigniew Burzyński (1902–1971), Polish balloonist and constructor of balloons
 Zbigniew Bzymek (born 1976), Polish-American filmmaker, experimental theatre and music video artist

C
 Zbigniew Chlebowski (born 1964), Polish politician
 Zbigniew Chmielowiec (born 1954), Polish politician, Member of Parliament
 Zbigniew Ciesielski (1934–2020), Polish mathematician
 Zbigniew Cybulski (1927–1967), Polish actor
 Zbigniew Ćwiąkalski (born 1950), Polish politician
 Zbigniew Czaja, Polish slalom canoeist
 Zbigniew Czajkowski (born 1921), Polish fencing coach
 Zbigniew Czerwiński (speedway rider) (born 1982), Polish speedway rider

D
 Zbigniew Dębski (1922–2010), Polish military personnel and co-founder of the Union of Warsaw Insurgents
 Zbigniew Deptuła (born 1962), Polish politician from the Polish People's Party
 Zbigniew Dłubak (1921–2005), Polish painter
 Zbigniew Doda (1931–2013), Polish chess player
 Zbigniew Dolata (born 1965), Polish politician, Member of Parliament
 Zbigniew Dregier (born 1935), Polish basketball player
 Zbigniew Drzewiecki (1890–1971), Polish pianist and music educator
 Zbigniew Dunin-Wasowicz (1882–1915), Polish military leader
 Zbigniew Dybol (born 1947), Polish handball player

F
 Zbigniew Fedyczak (born 1952), Polish sports shooter
 Zbigniew Fil (born 1977), Polish singer and multi-instrumentalist
 Zbigniew Firlej (c. 1613–1649), noble of the Polish-Lithuanian Commonwealth
 Zbigniew Antoni Fronczek (born 1935), Polish politician

G
 Zbigniew Gawlik (born 1956), Polish handball player
 Zbigniew Gawlor (1946–2003), Polish luger
 Zbigniew Girzyński (born 1973), Member of Parliament
 Zbigniew Gołąb (1923–1994), Polish linguist and Slavist
 Zbigniew Grzybowski (born 1976), Polish football winger
 Zbigniew Gut (1949–2010), Polish football defender

H
 Zbigniew Herbert (1924–1998), Polish poet, essayist, drama writer and moralist
 Zbigniew Herman (1935–2010), Polish physician and pharmacologist
 Zbigniew Hoffmann (born 1963), Polish politician

J
 Zbigniew Jagiełło (born 1964), Polish banker
 Zbigniew Janiszewski (born 1931), Polish pole vaulter
 Zbigniew Januszkiewicz (born 1962), Polish swimmer
 Zbigniew Jaremski (1949–2011), Polish sprinter
 Zbigniew Jaworowski (1927–2011) Polish physician and alpinist
 Zbigniew Juszczak (born 1975), Polish field hockey player

K
 Zbigniew Kabata (1924–2014), Polish parasitologist, World War II veteran, poet, fisherman, translator and scientific administrator
 Zbigniew Kaczmarek (disambiguation), multiple people, including:
Zbigniew Kaczmarek (weightlifter) (born 1946), Polish weightlifter, Olympic medalist
Zbigniew Kaczmarek (footballer) (born 1962), Polish football player
 Zbigniew Karkowski (1958–2013), Polish composer and musician
 Zbigniew Karpus (born 1954), Polish historian
 Zbigniew Kiernikowski (born 1946), Polish Roman Catholic priest, professor
 Zbigniew Komorowski, Polish figure skater
 Zbigniew Kowalski (born 1970), Polish football defender
 Zbigniew Kozak (born 1961), Polish politician, Member of Parliament
 Zbigniew Kruszyński (born 1960), Polish football player
 Zbigniew Kupczynski (born 1928), Polish-Canadian abstract expressionist artist 
 Zbigniew Kuźmiński (1921–2005), Polish film director and screenwriter
 Zbigniew Kuźmiuk (born 1956), Polish politician
 Zbigniew Kwiatkowski (born 1985), Polish handball player

L
 Zbigniew Lengren (1919–2003), Polish cartoonist, caricaturist, and illustrator
 Zbigniew Leśniak (born 1950), Polish slalom canoeist
 Zbigniew Lew-Starowicz (born 1943), Polish psychiatrist and psychotherapist
 Zbigniew Libera (born 1959), Polish artist
 Zbigniew J. Lipowski (1924–1997), Polish psychiatrist, historian, author, political commentator and speaker
 Zbigniew Lubiejewski (born 1949), Polish volleyball player

M
 Zbigniew Marciniak (born 1952), Polish mathematician and university teacher
 Zbigniew Makomaski (born 1931), Polish middle-distance runner
 Zbigniew Makowski (born 1930), Polish painter
 Zbigniew Małkowski (born 1978), Polish football goalkeeper
 Zbigniew Matwiejew (born 1949), Polish fencer
 Zbigniew Messner (1929–2014), Polish politician and economist
 Zbigniew Miązek (born 1966), Polish slalom canoer
 Zbigniew Michalewicz, Polish entrepreneur, author and professor 
 Zbigniew Morsztyn (c. 1628–1689), Polish poet

N
 Zbigniew Namysłowski (born 1939), Polish jazz composer
 Zbigniew Nienacki (1929–1994), Polish writer
 Zbigniew Nieradka, Polish glider pilot
 Zbigniew Niewiadomski (born 1946), Polish sprint canoer
 Zbigniew Niszczot (born 1955), Australian rugby league player
 Zbigniew Nowosadzki (born 1957), Polish painter

O
 Zbigniew Okoński (born 1949), Polish politician and businessman
 Zbigniew Oleśnicki (disambiguation), multiple people, including:
Zbigniew Oleśnicki (cardinal) (1389–1455), Roman Catholic clergyman and a Polish statesman and diplomat
Zbigniew Oleśnicki (primate of Poland) (c. 1430–1493), Roman Catholic clergyman and Polish politician
 Zbigniew Orywał (born 1930), Polish middle-distance runner

P
 Zbigniew Pacelt (born 1951), Polish politician and athlete
 Zbigniew Pakleza (born 1986), Polish chess Grandmaster
 Zbigniew Paleta (born 1942), Polish violinist and composer for telenovelas
 Zbigniew Paradowski (born 1932), Polish rower
 Zbigniew Pełczyński (1925–2021), Polish-British political philosopher and academic
 Zbigniew Piątek (born 1966), Polish road racing cyclist
 Zbigniew Pierzynka, Polish long-distance runner
 Zbigniew Pietrzykowski (1934–2014), Polish boxer, Olympian
 Zbigniew Piórkowski (1929–1994), Polish boxer, Olympian
 Zbigniew Podraza (born 1953) Polish politician, member of Sejm and mayor of Dąbrowa Górnicza
 Zbigniew Preisner (born 1955), Polish film score composer
 Zbigniew Promiński (born 1978), nicknamed "Inferno", Polish death metal drummer
 Zbigniew Przybyszewski (1907–1952), Polish military officer and a Commander in the Polish Navy

R
 Zbigniew Radziwonowicz (1930–2002), Polish athlete in the javelin throw
 Zbigniew Raszewski (1925–1992), Polish writer and theatre historian
 Zbigniew Religa (1938–2009), Polish cardiac surgeon and politician
 Zbigniew Romaszewski (1940–2014), Polish conservative politician, senator, and human rights activist
 Zbigniew Rybczyński (born 1949),  Polish filmmaker, director, cinematographer, and screenwriter
 Zbigniew Rychlicki (1922–1989), Polish graphic artist and illustrator of children's books
 Zbigniew Rynasiewicz (born 1963), Polish politician

S
 Zbigniew Sawan (1904–1984), Polish stage and film actor
 Zbigniew Schodowski (born 1987), Polish rower
 Zbigniew Schwarzer (1928–2008), Polish rower
 Zbigniew Ścibor-Rylski (1917–2018), Polish aviator, officer of the Home Army, Brigadier General of the Polish Army
 Zbigniew Seifert (1946–1979), Polish jazz musician
 Zbigniew Siemiątkowski (born 1957), Polish politician
 Zbigniew Skowroński (1925–1992), Polish bobsledder
 Zbigniew Skrudlik (born 1934), Polish fencer
 Zbigniew Ślusarski (born 1947), Polish rower
 Zbigniew Sosnowski (born 1963), Polish politician, Member of Parliament
 Zbigniew Spruch (born 1965), Polish cyclist
 Zbigniew Stonoga (born 1974), Polish  entrepreneur, videobloger, social and political activist
 Zbigniew Stryj (born 1968), Polish actor
 Zbigniew Stypułkowski (1904–1979), Polish lawyer and politician
 Zbigniew Suchecki (born 1984), Polish speedway rider
 Zbigniew Suszyński (born 1961), Polish film, television and theater actor
 Zbigniew Syka (1936–1996), Polish sprinter
 Zbigniew Szafrański, Polish Egyptologist
 Zbigniew Szczepkowski (born 1952), Polish cyclist
 Zbigniew Szewczyk (born 1967), Polish football player and coach
 Zbigniew Szydlo (born 1949), English chemist, academic and teacher
 Zbigniew Szymczak (born 1952), Polish chess player

T
 Zbigniew Tęczyński (c. 1450–1498), Polish nobleman
 Zbigniew Torzecki, Polish sprint canoer
 Zbigniew Tłuczyński (born 1956), Polish handball player and coach
 Zbigniew Turski (1908–1979), Polish composer

W
 Zbigniew Wachowicz (born 1972), Polish football defender
 Zbigniew Wassermann (1949–2010), minister-member of the Council of Ministers, coordinator of special services
 Zbigniew Wawer, Polish historian, specializing in Polish military history in World War II
 Zbigniew Włodkowski (born 1961), Polish politician, Member of Parliament
 Zbigniew Wodecki (1950–2017), Polish musician
 Zbigniew Wóycicki (1902–1928), Polish officer and skier
 Zbigniew Woźnicki (1958–2008), Polish cyclist
 Zbigniew Wyciszkiewicz (born 1969), Polish football midfielder

Z
 Zbigniew Zakrzewski (disambiguation), multiple people, including:
Zbigniew Zakrzewski (footballer) (born 1981), Polish footballer
Zbigniew Zakrzewski (economist) (1912–1992), Polish economist
 Zbigniew Zaleski (born 1947), Polish politician
 Zbigniew Załuski (1926–1978), Polish army officer, writer and Member of Parliament
 Zbigniew Zamachowski (born 1961), Polish actor
 Zbigniew Zapasiewicz (1934–2009), Polish actor, theatre director, and pedagogue
 Zbigniew Żarnowiecki (born 1927), Polish rower
 Zbigniew Zarzycki (born 1948), Polish volleyball player
 Zbigniew Ziobro (born 1970), Polish politician
 Zbigniew Żedzicki (born 1945), Polish wrestler
 Zbigniew Żupnik (1951–2000), Polish painter
 Zbigniew Zychowicz (1953–2016), Polish politician and member of the Democratic Left Alliance

See also 
 Zbyszko
 Polish name
 Slavic names

References

Polish masculine given names
Slovak masculine given names